Mister Fear is the name of four supervillains appearing in American comic books published by Marvel Comics. The character is often depicted as an antagonist to the hero Daredevil.

Publication history
Mister Fear is the identity of multiple supervillains who use a special 'fear gas' fired from a gas pellet gun; the original version (Zoltan Drago) first appeared in Daredevil #6 (February 1965) and was created by Stan Lee and Wally Wood.

Star Saxon first appeared as the second version in Daredevil #54 (July 1969).

The third version (Larry Cranston) first appeared in Daredevil #89 (July 1972) and was created by Gerry Conway and Gene Colan.

The fourth version (Alan Fagan) first appeared in Marvel Team-Up #92 (April 1980) and was created by Steven Grant and Carmine Infantino.

Fictional character biographies

Zoltan Drago

Zoltan Drago was the proprietor of a financially ailing wax museum who attempted to use his knowledge of chemistry to create an elixir which would turn his wax statues into living creatures, with which he would create a private army. The chemical failed to create life in wax, but Drago discovered that it could evoke fear when inhaled. He designed a frightening costume for himself as the Mister Fear persona.

As the original Mister Fear, Drago used his fear-gas to make terrified slaves of the brutish Ox of the Enforcers and the Eel. Naming his triumvirate as the Fellowship of Fear, he ran afoul in New York City and was soundly defeated by Daredevil and imprisoned. Drago was later killed by Starr Saxon for his Mister Fear equipment, and later Larry Cranston decided to take on the Mister Fear gear.

Starr Saxon

Criminal engineer Samuel "Starr" Saxon desired the means to confront Daredevil directly. Despite his knowledge with robots, he gunned down Zolton Drago and stole the Mister Fear gear. As the second Mister Fear, Saxon humiliated Daredevil in televised battles, casting himself as the hero in a series of charity-funding battles against the superhero. In the final battle with Daredevil, Saxon was unmasked, and plunged to his death. Saxon's robots would use his mind as the template for the Machinesmith's central consciousness.

Larry Cranston

Lawrence "Larry" Cranston was a law school classmate of Matt Murdock who also became an employer for a while. Cranston was staying in a hotel room across the hall from Zoltan Drago. He happened to overhear Starr Saxon killing Drago, and after learning that Saxon himself had died, Cranston decided to take on the Mister Fear guise himself.

As the third Mister Fear, Cranston went mad during his first effort against Daredevil in San Francisco, jumping off a building, assuming that he was wearing a rocket pack which he had previously worn in battle with the hero, and seemingly died due to injuries sustained in a fall.

Cranston survived the fall and returned years later. He masterminded a series of campaigns meant to discredit Daredevil with the aid of the Enforcers, the Eel, and the sleepless woman Insomnia. Daredevil defeated them and Cranston abandoned the Mister Fear identity.

Cranston later resurfaced, along with the Enforcers at his side, providing the criminals of Hell's Kitchen a drug that causes the user to become psychotic and completely unafraid of death, in the "Without Fear" storyline. He also made an attempt to overthrow the Hood, as New York's main crime boss. In an attempt to make Daredevil's life miserable, Cranston also secretly gave an overdose of the drug to Milla Donovan (Daredevil's wife); the result led to an innocent man's murder by Milla. The two fought, but Cranston, having murdered the drug's creator and destroyed all of the antidote's known samples, forced Daredevil to spare his life due to the fact that he was the only one whose testimony could save Milla from being sentenced to death for the murder committed earlier. But before he was sent to prison, Cranston had one of his henchmen provide him with a new chemical compound he had created: one that made everyone worship him. With this new power, Cranston entered jail as a prison "king", surrounded by bodyguards, saluted by prison guards, and entering a lavish cell with a female officer waiting to greet him.

During the "King in Black" storyline, Mister Fear is among the villains recruited by Mayor Wilson Fisk to be part of the Thunderbolts at the time of Knull's invasion.

Alan Fagan

Alan Fagan was born in Madison, Wisconsin. He is Larry Cranston's nephew and Ariel Tremmore's father. When Larry seemingly died, he came into possession of the fear gas and other equipment. Unlike the other versions, Fagan's primary adversary was Spider-Man, not Daredevil.

As the fourth Mister Fear, Fagan attempted to use his fear-gas in blackmail schemes which were stymied by Spider-Man, with the aid of Hawkeye. Fagan was brutally attacked in prison, much of the skin carved from his face by men in the employ of Ariel, who used the skin to draw out the fear-gas residue his daughter used to turn herself into the villain Shock.  

Fagan recovered from these injuries and received improved weaponry from Latveria's interim ruler Lucia von Bardas, including a suit of armor resembling a metallic version of the traditional Mister Fear costume. The weaponry was destroyed at the climax of the Secret War miniseries.

Fagan was one of the many criminals to escape from the Raft prison facility, being a thrall of the villain Crossfire. During his efforts in Crossfire's service, Fagan was again defeated by Spider-Man.

As opposed to Cranston, Fagan has been hired by the Hood to take advantage of the superhero community split caused by the Superhuman Registration Act.

During the Fear Itself storyline, Fagan discovers that the Serpent and the Worthy are outdoing his talents of inducing fear in people.

Powers and abilities
Mister Fear employs a compound based on the flight scent pheromone—chemicals produced by most animals, used to communicate a variety of simple messages over distances. This flight-scent pheromone stimulates fear reactions in herd animals. The drug is tailored for human beings, whose reactions to pheromones are not completely understood. It induces severe anxiety, fear, and panic, and sometimes nightmarish hallucinations in his victims, rendering them incapable of fighting or resisting his will. The drug is most commonly used in the form of gas pellets shot from a gun. The pellets rupture on contact, releasing the flight scent, which is inhaled by the victim. The dosage contained in one pellet is enough to incapacitate a normal adult male for about 15 minutes, or an exceptionally fit male, such as Daredevil, for about five minutes. The side effects of anxiety, edginess, and mild nausea can persist for several days.

Zoltan Drago had a gifted intellect and was an accomplished sculptor of wax figures. He was also a talented amateur chemist, and invented the fear pellets that he and the others used as Mister Fear.

Larry Cranston had a law degree, and a fair amount of legal expertise. He sometimes employed one-man jet devices, as Mister Fear. When Larry came after Matt Murdock in an attempt to ruin the man's life, he displayed the ability to influence the minds of other people into doing whatever he wanted them to do. Using a drug he created, he also made himself fearless. He also trained extensively in hand-to-hand combat for his confrontation with Daredevil.

Alan Fagan discovered that the flight scent can be administered in other ways: he has used a miniature hypodermic needle mounted on his ring to inject a large dose of the liquid directly into his victim's bloodstream. He has also used a hand-held weapon that fires capsules of the fear gas. Small but effective doses of the flight scent can be absorbed through the pores in the skin within an enclosed space, but the length of time it takes limits its usefulness. Working with an unidentified chemist, Fagan has also adapted other pheromones to his use, including one that makes a man sexually irresistible to women. Alan is a highly adept businessman. He briefly wore a suit of armor, which presumably at least provided protection from injury. Chronic exposure to his various chemicals has resulted in accumulation of his fear drug within Fagan's skin. Though he has not proven able to utilize this himself, samples of his skin were used by Ariel Tremmore to gain superhuman powers as Shock.

References

External links

Marvel.com: Mister Fear

Articles about multiple fictional characters
Characters created by Gene Colan
Characters created by Gerry Conway
Characters created by Stan Lee
Characters created by Steve Englehart
Comics characters introduced in 1965
Comics characters introduced in 1972
Comics characters introduced in 1980
Fictional businesspeople
Fictional characters from Madison, Wisconsin
Fictional characters from Wisconsin
Fictional Columbia University people
Fictional engineers
Marvel Comics male supervillains
Marvel Comics supervillains